Park Chan-hee (Hangul: 박찬희, Hanja: 朴贊希; born 23 March 1957) is a retired South Korean boxer. As a professional he held the WBC and lineal titles in the flyweight division. As an amateur he won a gold medal at the 1974 Asian Games and placed fifth at the 1976 Summer Olympics.

Amateur career
Park competed at the 1976 Montreal Olympic Games as a Light Flyweight for South Korea. His results were:
Defeated Abderahim Najim (Morocco) DQ 3
Defeated Alican Az (Turkey) 5–0
Lost to Jorge Hernandez (Cuba) 2–3

Pro career
Park turned professional in 1976 and became the WBC and lineal flyweight champion with a decision win over Miguel Canto in 1979. He lost the titles to Shoji Oguma by KO in 1980.

Honors
 Named The Ring magazine Progress of the Year fighter for 1979.

Professional boxing record

See also
List of flyweight boxing champions
List of WBC world champions

References

External links

 
 Park Chan-hee – CBZ Profile

Light-flyweight boxers
Flyweight boxers
Olympic boxers of South Korea
Boxers at the 1976 Summer Olympics
Asian Games medalists in boxing
Boxers at the 1974 Asian Games
World boxing champions
World flyweight boxing champions
World Boxing Council champions
Sportspeople from Busan
South Korean male boxers
Asian Games gold medalists for South Korea
1957 births
Living people
Medalists at the 1974 Asian Games